Now Deh (also Romanized as Naudeh; also known as Naudekh) is a village in Khorgam Rural District, Khorgam District, Rudbar County, Gilan Province, Iran. At the 2006 census, its population was 725, in 215 families.

References 

Populated places in Rudbar County